Tatum is a town in Lea County, New Mexico, United States. The population was 798 at the 2010 census, up from 683 in 2000.

Geography
Tatum is located in northern Lea County at  (33.255401, -103.316143). U.S. Route 380 passes through the town, leading west  to Roswell and east  to Plains, Texas. New Mexico State Road 206 crosses US 380 in the center of Tatum, leading north  to Portales and south  to Lovington, the Lea county seat.

Demographics

As of the census of 2000, there were 683 people, 267 households, and 194 families residing in the town. The population density was 578.8 people per square mile (223.5/km). There were 391 housing units at an average density of 331.3 per square mile (127.9/km). The racial makeup of the town was 65.45% White, 1.02% African American, 0.59% Native American, 0.15% Pacific Islander, 30.31% from other races, and 2.49% from two or more races. Hispanic or Latino of any race were 37.34% of the population.

There were 267 households, out of which 31.5% had children under the age of 18 living with them, 61.0% were married couples living together, 7.9% had a female householder with no husband present, and 27.3% were non-families. 25.8% of all households were made up of individuals, and 12.4% had someone living alone who was 65 years of age or older. The average household size was 2.56 and the average family size was 3.08.

In the town, the population was spread out, with 28.1% under the age of 18, 6.9% from 18 to 24, 25.5% from 25 to 44, 23.7% from 45 to 64, and 15.8% who were 65 years of age or older. The median age was 38 years. For every 100 females, there were 96.8 males. For every 100 females age 18 and over, there were 95.6 males.

The median income for a household in the town was $28,833, and the median income for a family was $33,393. Males had a median income of $31,111 versus $19,750 for females. The per capita income for the town was $11,728. About 16.6% of families and 18.7% of the population were below the poverty line, including 21.8% of those under age 18 and 21.6% of those age 65 or over.

Transportation

Airport
Tatum Airport is a town-owned, public-use airport located three nautical miles (6 km) east of the central business district of Tatum.

Major roads
  U.S. Route 380
  State Road 206

See also

 List of municipalities in New Mexico

References

External links

 

Towns in Lea County, New Mexico
Towns in New Mexico